Nick Koster may refer to:
 Nick Köster, South African rugby union player
 Nick Koster (footballer), Dutch footballer